Actin-related protein 2/3 complex subunit 1A is a protein that in humans is encoded by the ARPC1A gene.

This gene encodes one of seven subunits of the human Arp2/3 protein complex. This subunit is a member of the SOP2 family of proteins and is most similar to the protein encoded by gene ARPC1B. The similarity between these two proteins suggests that they both may function as p41 subunit of the human Arp2/3 complex that has been implicated in the control of actin polymerization in cells. It is possible that the p41 subunit is involved in assembling and maintaining the structure of the Arp2/3 complex. Multiple versions of the p41 subunit may adapt the functions of the complex to different cell types or developmental stages.

References

External links

Further reading